Spunk is a brand of Danish candy, launched in 1971 by Danish candy manufacturers Galle & Jessen and commonly sold in Denmark and Germany.

History
In 1971 Galle & Jessen were looking for a name for their new candy. They came across the name "Spunk" in the Pippi Longstocking book Pippi in the South Seas, in which Pippi invents a word for which she can find no use. The boxes bear the name Spunk and a drawing of a "fantasy animal" made by an 8-year-old girl.  As with the Danish Ga-Jol pastilles (also produced by Galle & Jessen), the boxes have a little saying or word of advice on the inside of the box lid.

Varieties
Spunk comes in three versions:
 pastilles made from salty liquorice and sold in a black box
 wine gums of four different flavours and colours—red, yellow, green, and orange—sold in a green box
 brown cola-flavoured wine gums sold in a brown box

Each box contains 20 or 23 grams of candy.

External links

 Spunk review with pictures by the American blog "Don't get mad, get even."
 Galle & Jessen Spunk home page (in Danish)
 Review of Spunk (and other kinds of Danish liquorice) (in Danish)

Danish confectionery
Candy
Liquorice (confectionery)
Brand name confectionery